Alberto Pérez may refer to:

People
 Alberto Pérez Pérez (1937–2017), Uruguayan law scholar
 Alberto Pérez Zabala (1925–2014), Spanish footballer
 Alberto Pérez-Gómez (born 1949), Mexican architectural historian
 Alberto Pérez (musician) (born 1950), Spanish singer, composer, guitarist and music producer
 Alberto Pérez Dayán (born 1960), Mexican judge
 Beto Pérez (born 1970), Colombian dancer

Places
 Estadio Alberto Pérez Navarro, football stadium in Mexico